Metropolitan Building may refer to:
Metropolitan Building (Detroit)
Metropolitan Building (Kolkata)
Metropolitan Buildings Office
Metropolitan Building (Minneapolis)
Metropolitan Building (Los Angeles)
The Metropolitan (Rochester)